23S rRNA (guanine748-N1)-methyltransferase (Rlma(II), Rlma2, 23S rRNA m1G748 methyltransferase, RlmaII, Rlma II, tylosin-resistance methyltransferase RlmA(II), TlrB, rRNA large subunit methyltransferase II) is an enzyme with systematic name S-adenosyl-L-methionine:23S rRNA (guanine748-N1)-methyltransferase. This enzyme catalyses the following chemical reaction

 S-adenosyl-L-methionine + guanine748 in 23S rRNA  S-adenosyl-L-homocysteine + N1-methylguanine748 in 23S rRNA

The enzyme specifically methylates guanine748 at N1 in 23S rRNA.

References

External links 
 

EC 2.1.1